Cello Sonata No. 1 may refer to:

 Cello Sonatas Nos. 1 and 2 (Beethoven), by Ludwig van Beethoven
 Cello Sonata No. 1 (Brahms), by Johannes Brahms
 Cello Sonata No. 1 (Mendelssohn), by Felix Mendelssohn
 Cello Sonata No. 1 (Reger), by Max Reger
 Cello Sonata No. 1 (Ries), by Ferdinand Ries
 Cello Sonata No. 1 (Fauré), by Gabriel Fauré
 Cello Sonata No. 1 (Oswald), by Henrique Oswald